is a Japanese professional baseball pitcher for the Fukuoka SoftBank Hawks of Nippon Professional Baseball (NPB).

Professional career
On October 24, 2013, Ishikawa was drafted as a developmental player by the Fukuoka Softbank Hawks in the 2013 Nippon Professional Baseball draft.

2014–2020 season
From 2014 to 2016, he played in informal matches against the Shikoku Island League Plus's teams and amateur baseball teams, and played in the Western League of NPB second leagues.

On July 1, 2016, he signed a 5 million yen contract with the Fukuoka SoftBank Hawks as a registered player under control

On April 4, 2017, Ishikawa pitched his debut game against the Tohoku Rakuten Golden Eagles as a relief pitcher. On May 31, he won the game as a starting pitcher for the first time. In 2017 season, he finished the regular season with a 34 Games pitched, a 8–3 Win–loss record, a 3.29 ERA, a one Holds, a 99 strikeouts in 98 1/3 innings. In post season, he pitched against the Yokohama DeNA BayStars as a relief pitcher in the 2017 Japan Series, and won the game for the first time in the Japan Series on October 31.

In 2018 season, Ishikawa finished the regular season with a 42 Games pitched, a 13–6 Win–loss record, a 3.60 ERA, a 6 Holds, a 96 strikeouts in 127 1/3 innings. On October 10, he was selected Japan national baseball team at the 2018 MLB Japan All-Star Series, but on November 2, he canceled his participation. And he pitched against the Hiroshima Toyo Carp as a relief pitcher in the 2018 Japan Series, but he felt uncomfortable on his right elbow and left the bench on October 31.

Ishikawa developed right elbow pain in April and spent most of the 2019 season in rehabilitation. He made a comeback on September 23, but only pitched two games in the 2019 season. However, he pitched as a relief pitcher and won in the 2019 Japan Series against the Yomiuri Giants, contributing to the team's third consecutive victory.

In the match against the Saitama Seibu Lions on August 1, 2020, Ishikawa recorded his first shutout game. In 2020 season, he finished the regular season with a 18 Games pitched, a 11–3 Win–loss record (Pacific League the most wins Champion, Winning percentage leader .786), a 2.42 ERA, a 103 strikeouts in 111.2 innings. In the 2020 Japan Series against the Yomiuri Giants, He pitched in Game 2 as a starting pitcher, becoming the first starting pitcher in his career to win the Japan Series and contributing to the team's fourth consecutive Japan Series champion. On December 17, Ishikawa was honored for the Pacific League most wins Champion Award, the Pacific League winning percentage leader Award, and the Pacific League Speed Up Award at the NPB AWARD 2020.

2021 season–present
On March 26, 2021, Ishikawa pitched against Chiba Lotte Marines in the opening game of the season and won the opening game for the first time as a pitcher from a developmental squad player. In 2021 season, he recorded with a 28 Games pitched, a 6–9 Win–loss record, a 3.40 ERA, and a 134 strikeouts in 156.1 innings.

In 2022 season, he suffered from an ankle injury. But he finished the regular season with a 23 Games pitched, a 7–10 Win–loss record, a 3.37 ERA, and a 106 strikeouts in 136.1 innings.

International career 
Ishikawa represented the Japan national baseball team in the Samurai Japan Series 2022.

Personal life 
On January 28, 2023, Ishikawa married former SKE48 member Mina Oba.

References

External links

 Career statistics - NPB.jp
29 Shuta Ishikawa PLAYERS2022 - Fukuoka SoftBank Hawks Official site

1991 births
Living people
Fukuoka SoftBank Hawks players
Japanese baseball players
Nippon Professional Baseball pitchers
Sōka University alumni
Baseball people from Tokyo